The deepsea sole (Embassichthys bathybius) is a flatfish of the family Pleuronectidae. Its native habitat is the northern Pacific, from Japan to the Gulf of Alaska and down the Pacific coasts of Canada and the USA as far south as Mexico.

References

deepsea sole
Fish of the North Pacific
deepsea sole